Seleznivka is a village in Kramatorsk Raion of Donetsk Oblast, Ukraine. It forms part of Mykolaivka urban hromada, one of the hromadas of Ukraine.

Until 18 July 2020, Raiske was located in Sloviansk Raion. The raion was abolished that day as part of the administrative reform of Ukraine, the number of raions of Donetsk Oblast was reduced to eight, of which only five were controlled by the government.

References

Villages in Kramatorsk Raion